We Are is the third studio album by English musician Lucy Spraggan. It was released on 4 May 2015 independently through Spraggan's label, CTRL Records. The album peaked at number 17 on the UK Albums Chart.

Singles
"Unsinkable" was released independently as the album's first single on 12 April 2015.

Track listing

Chart performance

Release history

References

Lucy Spraggan albums
2015 albums
Albums produced by Jon Maguire